Richard Leigh (dates unknown) was an 18th-century English businessman and cricket patron who ran his own R. Leigh's XI cricket team in nine first-class matches 1793–95. His son, also Richard Leigh, played first-class cricket in the 1800s but there is no record of Leigh senior having done so. Leigh, who resided at Wilmington, near Dartford, was an elected (1793) member of the Hambledon Club and an early member of Marylebone Cricket Club (MCC). He was such a prominent match organiser in the 1790s that the Duchess of Gordon reportedly said to him: "Though I am the first, you are the second match-maker in England, Mr Leigh".

References

Bibliography

External links
CricketArchive re R. Leigh's XI

Cricket patrons
English cricket in the 18th century
English cricketers of 1787 to 1825
People from Wilmington, Kent
Year of birth unknown
Year of death unknown